Jurčo is a Slovak family name:

Matej Jurčo (1984) Slovak road bicycle racer
Milan Jurčo (1957) Czechoslovak road bicycle racer
Pavol Jurčo (1986) Slovak footballer
Tomáš Jurčo (1992) Slovak ice hockey player

Slovak-language surnames